The durian is the edible fruit of several tree species belonging to the genus Durio. There are 30 recognised Durio species, at least nine of which produce edible fruit. Durio zibethinus, native to Borneo and Sumatra, is the only species available in the international market. It has over 300 named varieties in Thailand and 100 in Malaysia, as of 1987. Other species are sold in their local regions. Durians are commonly associated with Southeast Asian cuisine, especially in Indonesia, Malaysia, Singapore, Thailand, Cambodia, Philippines, Bangladesh and Vietnam.

Named in some regions as the "king of fruits", the durian is distinctive for its large size, strong odour, and thorn-covered rind. Its shape ranges from oblong to round, the colour of its husk green to brown, and its flesh pale yellow to red, depending on the species.

An acquired taste, some people regard the durian as having a pleasantly sweet fragrance, whereas others find the aroma overpowering and unpleasant. The smell evokes reactions from deep appreciation to intense disgust, and has been described variously as rotten onions, turpentine, and raw sewage. The persistence of its odour, which may linger for several days, has led certain hotels and public transportation services in Southeast Asia to ban the fruit. The nineteenth-century British naturalist Alfred Russel Wallace described its flesh as "a rich custard highly flavoured with almonds". The flesh can be consumed at various stages of ripeness, and it is used to flavour a wide variety of savoury and sweet desserts in Southeast Asian cuisines. The seeds can also be eaten when cooked.

Etymology
The name "durian" is derived from the Malay word  (meaning 'thorn'), a reference to the numerous prickly thorns on its rind, combined with the noun-building suffix . According to the Oxford English Dictionary, the alternate spelling durion was first used in a 1588 translation of The History of the Great and Mighty Kingdom of China and the Situation Thereof by the Spanish explorer Juan González de Mendoza:

Other historical variants include duryoen, duroyen, durean, and dorian. The name of the type species, Durio zibethinus, is derived from Viverra zibetha (the large Indian civet), a mammal known for its odour.

Taxonomy

Durio sensu lato has 30 recognised species. Durio sensu stricto comprises 24 of these species. The 6 additional species included in Durio s.l. are now considered by some to comprise their own genus, Boschia. Durio s.s. and Boschia have indistinguishable vegetative characteristics and many shared floral characteristics. The crucial difference between the two is that anther locules open by apical pores in Boschia and by longitudinal slits in Durio s.s. These two genera form a clade that is sister to another genus in the tribe Durioneae, Cullenia. These three genera together form a clade that is characterised by highly modified (mono- and polythecate, as opposed to bithecate) anthers.

The genus Durio is placed by some taxonomists in the family Bombacaceae, or by others in a broadly defined Malvaceae that includes Bombacaceae, and by others in a smaller family of just seven genera Durionaceae.

Durio is often included in Bombacaceae because of the presence of monothecate anthers, as opposed to the bithecate anthers common to the rest of the mallows (and angiosperms, in general). However, the first studies to examine mallow phylogeny using molecular data found that the tribe Durioneae should be placed in the subfamily Helicteroideae of an expanded Malvaceae. The authors of these studies hypothesise that monothecate anthers have most likely evolved convergently in Durioneae and in the Malvatheca clade (comprising Malvaceae s.l. subfamilies Malvoideae and Bombacoideae).

A draft genome analysis of durian indicates it has about 46,000 coding and non-coding genes, among which a class called methionine gamma-lyases – which regulate the odour of organosulfur compounds – may be primarily responsible for the distinct durian odour. Genome analysis also indicated that the closest plant relative of durian is cotton.

Description

The flowers are produced in three to thirty clusters together on large branches and directly on the trunk with each flower having a calyx (sepals) and five (rarely four or six) petals. Durian trees have one or two flowering and fruiting periods per year, although the timing varies depending on the species, cultivars, and localities. A typical durian tree can bear fruit after four or five years. The durian fruit can hang from any branch, and matures roughly three months after pollination. Its shape ranges from oblong to round, the colour of its husk green to brown, and its flesh pale-yellow to red, depending on the species. Among the thirty known species of Durio, nine of them have been identified as producing edible fruits: D. zibethinus, D. dulcis, D. grandiflorus, D. graveolens, D. kutejensis, Durio lowianus, D. macrantha, D. oxleyanus and D. testudinarius. The fruit of many species has never been collected or properly examined, however, so other species may have edible fruit. The durian is somewhat similar in appearance to the jackfruit, an unrelated species. 

D. zibethinus is the only species commercially cultivated on a large scale and available outside of its native region. Since this species is open-pollinated, it shows considerable diversity in fruit colour and odour, size of flesh and seed, and tree phenology. In the species name, zibethinus refers to the Indian civet, Viverra zibetha. There is disagreement over whether this name, bestowed by Linnaeus, refers to civets being so fond of the durian that the fruit was used as bait to entrap them, or to the durian smelling like the civet.

Durian flowers are large and feathery with copious nectar, and give off a heavy, sour, and buttery odour. These features are typical of flowers pollinated by certain species of bats that eat nectar and pollen. According to research conducted in Malaysia in the 1970s, durians were pollinated almost exclusively by cave fruit bats (Eonycteris spelaea); however, a 1996 study indicated two species, D. grandiflorus and D. oblongus, were pollinated by spiderhunters (Nectariniidae) and another species, D. kutejensis, was pollinated by giant honey bees and birds as well as bats.

Some scientists have hypothesised that the development of monothecate anthers and larger flowers (compared to those of the remaining genera in Durioneae) in the clade consisting of Durio, Boschia, and Cullenia was in conjunction with a transition from beetle pollination to vertebrate pollination.

Cultivars

Over the centuries, numerous durian cultivars, propagated by vegetative clones, have arisen in Southeast Asia. They used to be grown with mixed results from seeds of trees bearing superior quality fruit, but now are propagated by layering, marcotting, or more commonly, by grafting, including bud, veneer, wedge, whip or U-grafting onto seedlings of randomly selected rootstocks. Different cultivars may be distinguished to some extent by variations in the fruit shape, such as the shape of the spines. Durian consumers express preferences for specific cultivars, which fetch higher prices in the market.

Malaysian varieties 

The Malaysian Ministry of Agriculture and Agro-Based Industry started to register varieties of durian in 1934, and now maintains a list of registered varieties, where each cultivar is assigned a common name and a code number starting with "D".  These codes are widely used through South-East Asia, and as of 2021, there are over 200 registered varieties.  Many superior cultivars have been identified through competitions held at the annual Malaysian Agriculture, Horticulture, and Agrotourism Show.  There are 13 common Malaysian varieties having favourable qualities of colour, texture, odour, taste, high yield, and resistance against various diseases.

Musang King (D197) is the most popular durian breed from Malaysia, rendered in Chinese as "Mao Shan Wang" (猫山王), which is usually the priciest of all cultivars. The origin of the name "Musang King" dates back to the 80s, when a man named Tan Lai Fook from Raub, Pahang stumbled upon a durian tree in Gua Musang, Kelantan. He brought the tree branch back to Raub for grafting, and this new breed attracted other cultivators. The cultivar was named after Gua Musang, its place of origin, while the Chinese name references the palm civet, the Malay meaning of musang.
Musang King is known for its bright yellow flesh and is like a more potent or enhanced version of the D24.  Musang King is also the preferred cultivar in Singapore and Vietnam.

Other popular cultivars in Malaysia include:
 "D24" (Sultan), a popular variety known for its bittersweet taste
 "XO", which has a pale colour, thick flesh with a tinge of alcoholic fermentation
 "Chook Kiok" (Cantonese meaning: bamboo leg) which has a distinctive yellowish core in the inner stem
 "D168" (IOI), which has a round shape, medium size, green and yellow outer skin colour, and has flesh easy to dislodge. The flesh is medium-thick, solid, yellow in colour, and sweet.
 "Red Prawn" (Udang Merah, D175), found in the states of Pahang and Johor. The fruit is medium-sized with oval shape, brownish green skin having short thorns. The flesh is thick, not solid, yellow-coloured, and has a sweet taste.

Indonesian varieties

Indonesia has more than 103 varieties of durian. The most cultivated species is Durio zibethinus. Notable varieties are Sukun durian (Central  Java), sitokong (Betawi), sijapang (Betawi), Simas (Bogor), Sunan (Jepara), si dodol, and si hijau (South  Kalimantan) and  Petruk (Jepara, Central  Java).

Thai varieties 

Mon Thong is the most commercially sought after, for its thick, full-bodied creamy and mild sweet-tasting flesh with relatively moderate smell emitted and smaller seeds, while Chanee is the best in terms of its resistance to infection by Phytophthora palmivora. Kan Yao is somewhat less common, but prized for its longer window of time when it is both sweet and odourless at the same time. Among all the cultivars in Thailand, five are currently in large-scale commercial cultivation: Chanee, Mon Thong, Kan Yao, Ruang, and Kradum. 

By 2007, Thai government scientist Songpol Somsri had crossbred more than ninety varieties of durian to create Chantaburi No. 1, a cultivar without the characteristic odour. Another hybrid, Chantaburi No. 3, develops the odour about three days after the fruit is picked, which enables an odourless transport yet satisfies consumers who prefer the pungent odour. On 22 May 2012, two other cultivars from Thailand that also lack the usual odour, Long Laplae and Lin Laplae, were presented to the public by Yothin Samutkhiri, governor of Uttaradit Province from where these cultivars were developed locally, while he announced the dates for the annual durian fair of Laplae District, and the name given to each cultivar.

Cultivation and availability

The durian is cultivated in tropical regions, and stops growing when mean daily temperatures drop below . The centre of ecological diversity for durians is the island of Borneo, where the fruits of the edible species of Durio including D. zibethinus, D. dulcis, D. graveolens, D. kutejensis, D. oxleyanus, and D. testudinarius are sold in local markets. 

D. zibethinus is not grown in Brunei because consumers there prefer other species such as D. graveolens, D. kutejensis, and D. oxleyanus. These species are commonly distributed in Brunei, and together with other species like D. testudinarius and D. dulcis constitute a genetically diverse crop source.

Although the durian is not native to Thailand, Thailand is ranked the world's number one exporter of durian, producing around 700,000 tonnes of durian per year, 400,000 tonnes of which are exported to mainland China and Hong Kong. Malaysia and Indonesia follow, both producing about 265,000 tonnes each. Of this, Malaysia exported 35,000 tonnes in 1999. Chantaburi in Thailand holds the World Durian Festival in early May each year. This single province is responsible for half of the durian production of Thailand. The Davao Region is the top producer of the fruit in the Philippines, producing 60% of the country's total. The Kadayawan Durian Festival is held in conjunction with the Kadayawan Festival, an annual celebration in Davao City, featuring durians and other fruits.

Durian was introduced into Australia in the early 1960s and clonal material was first introduced in 1975. Over thirty clones of D. zibethinus and six other Durio species have been subsequently introduced into Australia. China is the major importer, purchasing 65,000 tonnes in 1999, followed by Singapore with 40,000 tonnes and Taiwan with 5,000 tonnes. In the same year, the United States imported 2,000 tonnes, mostly frozen, and the European Community imported 500 tonnes. Due to the increasing popularity of durian in China, the price had risen up to 20 times over in four years, in a market that was worth nearly £400m in 2018. Malaysia negotiated a deal with China to export the whole fruit frozen for the first time to China starting in 2019, previously only Thailand was permitted to export the whole fruit to China. In 2021, exports of durians to China have increased to 821,500 tonnes which was 4 times compared to 2017, and a 42.7 percent increase from the year before. The large majority of that was sourced from Thailand where China purchased at least US$3.4 billion worth or 90 percent of Thailand's fresh durian exports in that year, according to the Thai Ministry of Commerce.

The durian is a seasonal fruit, unlike some other non-seasonal tropical fruits such as the papaya which are available throughout the year. In peninsular Malaysia and Singapore, the season for durians is typically from June to August, coinciding with that of the mangosteen.

Prices of durians are high due to postharvest changes and having a short shelf life in normal temperatures. In Singapore in 2007, the strong demand for high quality cultivars such as the D24 (Sultan), and Musang King (Mao Shan Wang) resulted in high retail prices. The edible portion of the fruit, known as the aril and usually referred to as the "flesh" or "pulp", only accounts for about 15–30% of the mass of the entire fruit. By 2018, Musang King farmers saw very large increases in the prices they received, making the fruit far more lucrative than palm oil or rubber. This led to an increase in durian plantation.

Flavour and odour
 

The unusual flavour and odour of the fruit have prompted many people to express diverse and passionate views ranging from deep appreciation to intense disgust. Writing in 1856, the British naturalist Alfred Russel Wallace provided a much-quoted description of the flavour of the durian:

Wallace described himself as being at first reluctant to try it because of the aroma, "but in Borneo I found a ripe fruit on the ground, and, eating it out of doors, I at once became a confirmed Durian eater". He cited one traveller from 1599: "it is of such an excellent taste that it surpasses in flavour all other fruits of the world, according to those who have tasted it." He cites another writer: "To those not used to it, it seems at first to smell like rotten onions, but immediately after they have tasted it they prefer it to all other food. The natives give it honourable titles, exalt it, and make verses on it."

While Wallace cautions that "the smell of the ripe fruit is certainly at first disagreeable", later descriptions by Westerners are more graphic in detail. Novelist Anthony Burgess writes that eating durian is "like eating sweet raspberry blancmange in the lavatory". Travel and food writer Richard Sterling says:

Other comparisons have been made with the civet, sewage, stale vomit, skunk spray and used surgical swabs.
The wide range of descriptions for the odour of durian may have a great deal to do with the variability of durian odour itself. Durians from different species or clones can have significantly different aromas; for example, red durian (D. dulcis) has a deep caramel flavour with a turpentine odour while red-fleshed durian (D. graveolens) emits a fragrance of roasted almonds. Among the varieties of D. zibethinus, Thai varieties are sweeter in flavour and less odorous than Malay ones. The degree of ripeness has an effect on the flavour as well.

In 2019, researchers from the Technical University of Munich identified ethanethiol and its derivatives as a reason for its fetid smell. However, the biochemical pathway by which the plant produces ethanethiol remained unclear such as the enzyme that releases ethanethiol.

The fruit's strong smell led to its ban from the subway in Singapore; it is not used in many hotels because of its pungency.

Phytochemicals
Hundreds of phytochemicals responsible for durian flavour and aroma include diverse volatile compounds, such as esters, ketones, alcohols (primarily ethanol), and organosulfur compounds, with various thiols. Ethyl 2-methylbutanoate had the highest content among esters in a study of several varieties. Sugar content, primarily sucrose, has a range of 8–20% among different durian varieties. Durian flesh contains diverse polyphenols, especially myricetin, and various carotenoids, including a rich content of beta-carotene.

People in Southeast Asia with frequent exposures to durian are able to easily distinguish the sweet-like scent of its ketones and esters from rotten or putrescine odours which are from volatile amines and fatty acids. Some individuals are unable to differentiate these smells and find this fruit noxious, whereas others find it pleasant and appealing.

This strong odour can be detected half a mile away by animals, thus luring them. In addition, the fruit is highly appetising to diverse animals, including squirrels, mouse deer, pigs, sun bear, orangutan, elephants, and even carnivorous tigers. While some of these animals eat the fruit and dispose of the seed under the parent plant, others swallow the seed with the fruit, and then transport it some distance before excreting, with the seed being dispersed as a result. The thorny, armoured covering of the fruit discourages smaller animals; larger animals are more likely to transport the seeds far from the parent tree.

Ripeness and selection
According to Larousse Gastronomique, the durian fruit is ready to eat when its husk begins to crack. However, the ideal stage of ripeness to be enjoyed varies from region to region in Southeast Asia and by species. Some species grow so tall that they can only be collected once they have fallen to the ground, whereas most cultivars of D. zibethinus are nearly always cut from the tree and allowed to ripen while waiting to be sold. Some people in southern Thailand prefer their durians relatively young when the clusters of fruit within the shell are still crisp in texture and mild in flavour. For some people in northern Thailand, the preference is for the fruit to be soft and aromatic. In Malaysia and Singapore, most consumers prefer the fruit to be as ripe and pungent in aroma as possible and may even risk allowing the fruit to continue ripening after its husk has already cracked open. In this state, the flesh becomes richly creamy and slightly alcoholic.

The various preferences regarding ripeness among consumers make it hard to issue general statements about choosing a "good" durian. A durian that falls off the tree continues to ripen for two to four days, but after five or six days most would consider it overripe and unpalatable, although some Thais proceed from that point to cook it with palm sugar, creating a dessert called durian (or thurian) guan.

Uses

Culinary

Durian fruit is used to flavour a wide variety of sweet edibles such as traditional Malay candy, ice kacang, dodol, lempuk, rose biscuits, ice cream, milkshakes, mooncakes, Yule logs, and cappuccino. Es durian (durian ice cream) is a popular dessert in Indonesia, sold at street side stall in Indonesian cities, especially in Java. Pulut Durian or ketan durian is glutinous rice steamed with coconut milk and served with ripened durian. In Sabah, red durian is fried with onions and chilli and served as a side dish. Red-fleshed durian is traditionally added to sayur, an Indonesian soup made from freshwater fish. Ikan brengkes tempoyak is fish cooked in a durian-based sauce, traditional in Sumatra. Dried durian flesh can be made into kripik durian (durian chips). 

Tempoyak refers to fermented durian, usually made from lower quality durian unsuitable for direct consumption. Tempoyak can be eaten either cooked or uncooked, is normally eaten with rice, and can also be used for making curry. Sambal Tempoyak is a  Malay dish made from the fermented durian fruit, coconut milk, and a collection of spicy ingredients known as sambal. In Malay peninsula and Sumatra, Pangasius catfish can be either cooked as tempoyak ikan patin (fish in tempoyak curry) or as brengkes (pais) tempoyak, which is a steamed fermented durian paste in banana leaf container. 

In Thailand, durian is often eaten fresh with sweet sticky rice, and blocks of durian paste are sold in the markets, though much of the paste is adulterated with pumpkin. Unripe durians may be cooked as a vegetable, except in the Philippines, where all uses are sweet rather than savoury. Malaysians make both sugared and salted preserves from durian. When durian is minced with salt, onions and vinegar, it is called boder. The durian seeds, which are the size of chestnuts, can be eaten whether they are boiled, roasted or fried in coconut oil, with a texture that is similar to taro or yam, but stickier. In Java, the seeds are sliced thin and cooked with sugar as a confection. Uncooked durian seeds are potentially toxic due to cyclopropene fatty acids and should not be ingested.

Young leaves and shoots of the durian are occasionally cooked as greens. Sometimes the ash of the burned rind is added to special cakes. The petals of durian flowers are eaten in the North Sumatra province of Indonesia and Sarawak of Malaysia, while in the Moluccas islands the husk of the durian fruit is used as fuel to smoke fish. The nectar and pollen of the durian flower that honeybees collect is an important honey source, but the characteristics of the honey are unknown.

Nutrition

Raw durian is composed of 65% water, 27% carbohydrates (including 4% dietary fibre), 5% fat and 1% protein. In 100 grams, raw or fresh frozen durian provides 33% of the Daily Value (DV) of thiamine and moderate content of other B vitamins, vitamin C, and the dietary mineral manganese (15–24% DV, table). Different durian varieties from Malaysia, Thailand and Indonesia vary in their carbohydrate content by 16–29%, fat content by 2–5%, protein content by 2–4%, dietary fibre content by 1–4%, and caloric value by 84–185 kcal per 100 grams. The fatty acid composition of durian flesh is particularly rich in oleic acid and palmitic acid.

Origin and history

The origin of the durian is thought to be in the region of Borneo and Sumatra, with wild trees in the Malay peninsula, and orchards commonly cultivated in a wide region from India to New Guinea. Four hundred years ago, it was traded across present-day Myanmar, and was actively cultivated especially in Thailand and South Vietnam.

The earliest known European reference to the durian is the record of Niccolò de' Conti, who travelled to Southeast Asia in the 15th century. Translated from the Latin in which Poggio Bracciolini recorded de Conti's travels: "They [people of Sumatra] have a green fruit which they call durian, as big as a watermelon. Inside there are five things like elongated oranges, and resembling thick butter, with a combination of flavours." The Portuguese physician Garcia de Orta described durians in Colóquios dos simples e drogas da India published in 1563. In 1741, Herbarium Amboinense by the German botanist Georg Eberhard Rumphius was published, providing the most detailed and accurate account of durians for over a century. The genus Durio has a complex taxonomy that has seen the subtraction and addition of many species since it was created by Rumphius. During the early stages of its taxonomical study, there was some confusion between durian and the soursop (Annona muricata), for both of these species had thorny green fruit. The Malay name for the soursop is durian Belanda, meaning Dutch durian. In the 18th century, Johann Anton Weinmann considered the durian to belong to Castaneae as its fruit was similar to the horse chestnut.

D. zibethinus was introduced into Ceylon by the Portuguese in the 16th century and was reintroduced many times later. It has been planted in the Americas but confined to botanical gardens. The first seedlings were sent from the Royal Botanic Gardens, Kew, to Auguste Saint-Arroman of Dominica in 1884.

In Southeast Asia, the durian has been cultivated for centuries at the village level, probably since the late 18th century, and commercially since the mid-20th century. In My Tropic Isle, Australian author and naturalist Edmund James Banfield tells how, in the early 20th century, a friend in Singapore sent him a durian seed, which he planted and cared for on his tropical island off the north coast of Queensland.

Since the early 1990s, the domestic and international demand for durian in the Association of Southeast Asian Nations (ASEAN) region has increased significantly, partly due to the increasing affluence of Southeast Asia.

In 1949, the British botanist E. J. H. Corner published The Durian Theory, or the Origin of the Modern Tree. His theory was that endozoochory (the enticement of animals to transport seeds in their stomach) arose before any other method of seed dispersal, and that primitive ancestors of Durio species were the earliest practitioners of that dispersal method, in particular red durian (D. dulcis) exemplifying the primitive fruit of flowering plants. However, in more recent circumscriptions of Durioneae, the tribe into which Durio and its sister taxa fall, fleshy arils and spiny fruits are derived within the clade. Some genera possess these characters, but others do not. The most recent molecular evidence (on which the most recent, well-supported circumscription of Durioneae is based) therefore refutes Corner's Durian Theory.

Culture and folk medicine

Cultural influences
A common local belief is that the durian is harmful when eaten with coffee or alcoholic beverages. The latter belief can be traced back at least to the 18th century when Rumphius stated that one should not drink alcohol after eating durians as it will cause indigestion and bad breath. In 1929, J. D. Gimlette wrote in his Malay Poisons and Charm Cures that the durian fruit must not be eaten with brandy. In 1981, J. R. Croft wrote in his Bombacaceae: In Handbooks of the Flora of Papua New Guinea that "a feeling of morbidity" often follows the consumption of alcohol too soon after eating durian. Several medical investigations on the validity of this belief have been conducted with varying conclusions, though a study by the University of Tsukuba finds the fruit's high sulphur content inhibits the activity of aldehyde dehydrogenase, causing a 70 percent reduction of the ability to clear toxins from the body.

The durian is commonly known as the "king of fruits", a label that can be attributed to its formidable look and overpowering odour. In its native Southeast Asia, the durian is an everyday food and portrayed in the local media in accordance with the cultural perception it has in the region. The durian symbolised the subjective nature of ugliness and beauty in Hong Kong director Fruit Chan's 2000 film Durian Durian (榴槤飄飄, lau lin piu piu), and was a nickname for the reckless but lovable protagonist of the eponymous Singaporean TV comedy Durian King played by Adrian Pang. Likewise, the oddly shaped Esplanade building in Singapore (Theatres on the Bay) is often called "The Durian" by locals, and "The Big Durian" is the nickname of Jakarta, Indonesia.

A durian falling on a person's head can cause serious injuries because it is heavy, armed with sharp thorns, and can fall from a significant height. Wearing a hardhat is recommended when collecting the fruit.  A common saying is that a durian has eyes, and can see where it is falling, because the fruit allegedly never falls during daylight hours when people may be hurt. However, people have died from durian falling on their heads, especially young children. A saying in Malay and Indonesian, durian runtuh, which translates to "getting hit by a durian", is the equivalent of the English phrase "windfall gain". Nevertheless, signs warning people not to linger under durian trees are found in Indonesia. Strong nylon or woven rope netting is often strung between durian trees in orchards, serving a threefold purpose: the nets aid in the collection of the mature fruits, deter ground-level scavengers, and prevent the durians from falling onto people. 

A naturally spineless variety of durian growing wild in Davao, Philippines, was discovered in the 1960s; fruits borne from these seeds also lacked spines. Since the bases of the scales develop into spines as the fruit matures, sometimes spineless durians are produced artificially by scraping scales off immature fruits. In Malaysia, a spineless durian clone D172 is registered by Agriculture Department on 17 June 1989. It was called "Durian Botak" ('Bald Durian'). In Indonesia, Ir Sumeru Ashari, head of Durian Research Centre, Universitas Brawijaya reported spineless durian from Kasembon, Malang. Another cultivar is from Lombok, Nusa Tenggara Barat, Indonesia. 

Animals such as Sumatran elephants and tigers are known to consume durians.

One of the names Thailand contributed to the list of storm names for Western North Pacific tropical cyclones was 'Durian', which was retired after the second storm of this name in 2006. Being a fruit much loved by a variety of wild beasts, the durian sometimes signifies the long-forgotten animalistic aspect of humans, as in the legend of Orang Mawas, the Malaysian version of Bigfoot, and Orang Pendek, its Sumatran version, both of which have been claimed to feast on durians.

Folk medicine
In Malaysia, a decoction of the leaves and roots used to be prescribed as an antipyretic. The leaf juice is applied on the head of a fever patient. The most complete description of the medicinal use of the durian as remedies for fevers is a Malay prescription, collected by Burkill and Haniff in 1930. It instructs the reader to boil the roots of Hibiscus rosa-sinensis with the roots of Durio zibethinus, Nephelium longan, Nephelium mutabile and Artocarpus integrifolia, and drink the decoction or use it as a poultice.

Southeast Asian traditional beliefs, as well as traditional Chinese food therapy, consider the durian fruit to have warming properties liable to cause excessive sweating. The traditional method to counteract this is to pour water into the empty shell of the fruit after the pulp has been consumed and drink it. An alternative method is to eat the durian in accompaniment with mangosteen, which is considered to have cooling properties. Pregnant women or people with high blood pressure are traditionally advised not to consume durian.

The Javanese believe durian to have aphrodisiac qualities, and impose a set of rules on what may or may not be consumed with it or shortly thereafter. A saying in Indonesian, meaning "the durian falls and the sarong comes up", refers to this belief. The warnings against the supposed lecherous quality of this fruit soon spread to the West – the Swedenborgian philosopher Herman Vetterling commented on so-called "erotic properties" of the durian in the early 20th century.

Environmental impact
The high demand for durians in China has prompted a shift in Malaysia from small-scale durian orchards to large-scale industrial operations. Forests are cleared to make way for large durian plantations, compounding an existing deforestation problem caused by the cultivation of oil palms. Animal species such as the small flying fox, which pollinates durian trees, and the Malayan tiger are endangered by the increasing deforestation of their habitats.

The prevalence of the Musang King and Monthong varieties in Malaysia and Thailand, respectively, has led to concerns about a decrease in the durian's genetic diversity at the expense of higher-quality varieties. A 2022 study of durian species in Kalimantan, Indonesia, found low genetic diversity, suggestive of inbreeding depression and genetic drift. Additionally, these dominant hybrid varieties are more susceptible to pests and fungal diseases, requiring the use of insecticides and fungicides that can weaken the trees.

See also

 Breadfruit
 List of delicacies
 List of durian diseases and pests

Notes

a.  Wallace makes an almost identical comment in his 1866 publication The Malay Archipelago: The land of the orang-utang and the bird of paradise.

b.  The traveller Wallace cites is Linschott (Wallace's spelling for Jan Huyghen van Linschoten), whose name appears repeatedly in Internet searches on durian, with such citations themselves tracing back to Wallace. In translations of Linschoten's writings, the fruit is spelled as duryoen.

References

 
Fruits originating in Asia
Tropical fruit
Southeast Asian cuisine
Tropical agriculture
Medicinal plants of Asia
Non-timber forest products
Taxa named by Carl Linnaeus
Helicteroideae